Maireana pentagona, the hairy bluebush, is a species of flowering plant in the family Amaranthaceae, native to Australia (except the Northern Territory and Tasmania). A prostrate or decumbent perennial, it typically grows in heavy soils.

References

pentagona
Endemic flora of Australia
Flora of Western Australia
Flora of South Australia
Flora of Queensland
Flora of New South Wales
Flora of Victoria (Australia)
Plants described in 1975